Melusine Productions, a division of Studio 352, is an animation company based in Howald, Luxembourg. The studio has produced series such as The Bellflower Bunnies, The Mysteries of Providence and Liberty's Kids. It has also produced the movies Song of the Sea, The Breadwinner and Wolfwalkers with Irish studio Cartoon Saloon, all of which have been Oscar nominated for Best Animated Feature.

References

External links
Official site of Studio 352
Companies established in 1997
Hesperange
Luxembourgian animation studios
Mass media companies established in 1997
Mass media companies of Luxembourg